Timothy Neilly (born 24 August 1987) is a retired Bahamian-American tennis player.

Neilly has a career-high ATP singles ranking of World No. 852, achieved on 22 March 2010. He also has a career-high ATP doubles ranking of World No. 924, achieved on 14 May 2007. 

As a junior, Neilly was a prominent player on ITF Junior Circuit, reaching as high as World No. 8. In 2004, he won the prestigious Orange Bowl singles under-18 title, defeating American Donald Young 6–4, 7–5 in the final.

Beginning in 2008, Neilly represented his native country the Bahamas, competing in the Davis Cup. He has an overall record of 3 wins and 5 losses across 6 ties played.

ATP Challenger and ITF Futures finals

Singles: 1 (0–1)

Doubles: 3 (0–3)

References

External links
 
 
 

1987 births
Living people
Bahamian male tennis players
American male tennis players